Adam Stephen ( – 16 July 1791) was a Scottish-born American doctor and military officer who helped found what became Martinsburg, West Virginia. He emigrated to North America, where he served in the Province of Virginia's militia under George Washington during the French and Indian War. He served under Washington again in the American Revolutionary War, rising to lead a division of the Continental Army.  After a friendly fire incident during the Battle of Germantown, Stephen was cashiered out of the army, but continued as a prominent citizen of western Virginia, including terms in the Virginia General Assembly representing Berkeley County.

Early and family life
Adam Stephen was born in Scotland.  He earned a degree at King's College in Aberdeen, and studied medicine in Edinburgh.  Stephen later married and had one child, Ann.

Naval doctor and emigrant

Stephen entered Royal Navy service on a hospital ship before emigrating to the British colony of Virginia in the late 1730s or early 1740s.  There he established a medical practice in Fredericksburg.

Soldier and pioneer
Stephen joined the provincial troops in 1754, and became lieutenant colonel of the Virginia Regiment under George Washington. The unit was based at Winchester (east of the Appalachian Mountains and the county seat of then-vast Frederick County), then explored westward across the Appalachian Mountains. It also fought native Americans, including battles at Jumonville Glen and Fort Necessity (both in 1754 and which some consider the opening engagements of the French and Indian War). The following year, Washington, Stephen and the Virginia militia participated in the disastrous Braddock Expedition. In 1756, Stephen led Virginia militiamen against the Creeks to relieve colonists from South Carolina. By 1759, Stephen was in command of at Fort Bedford (on the west side of the Appalachian range near the South Branch of the Potomac River) and begged for cattle to be delivered to Fort Pitt (the future Pittsburgh). 

In 1761, Stephen had received cattle and other goods necessary to organize and fund the Timberlake Expedition, which attempted to reconcile British and Cherokee interests following the Anglo-Cherokee War (part of the much broader French and Indian War).  In the summer of 1763, settlers complained of raids by Delaware and Shawnees on South Branch settlements so that many inhabitants of then-Hampshire County had abandoned their homes, so in August the Governor authorized Col. Stephen to draft 500 men from the militias of Hampshire, Culpeper, Fauquier, Loudoun and Frederick County militias, and the next month told them to continue guarding the posts on the South Branch and Patterson Creek, lest the Native Americans retaliate for their loss that summer at Brushy Run just south of Pittsburgh to British troops commanded by Col. Henry Bouquet. While Captain Charles Lewis escorted 60 former settler prisoners back to Fort Pitt in 1764, Stephen had assumed command of the Virginia Regiment from Washington, and traveled westward to assist in putting down Pontiac's Rebellion.

When the American Revolutionary War broke out, Stephen offered his services to the Continental Army, again serving under Washington.  He was with the army during the New York and New Jersey campaigns of 1776 and early 1777, and, as a major general, was given command of a division in Washington's army during the defense of Philadelphia.  In the October 1777 Battle of Germantown, Stephen's men fought in the fog with troops led by General Anthony Wayne. Stephen was accused of being drunk during the battle and after being convicted in a court martial, was stripped of his command and cashiered out of the army, making him the only Continental army general court-martialed and immediately dismissed from the service during the war.

Politician

Stephen had lived in western Virginia before the war broke out, and voters from Berkeley County (created in 1772) had elected him as one of their two delegates (alongside Robert Rutherford) to the Second Virginia Revolutionary Convention, which was held at St. John's Episcopal Church in Richmond between March 20 and March 27, 1775. When the war ended, he returned to Berkeley County (in what long after his death became West Virginia),. In 1778 Stephen laid out the plan for Martinsburg, and named the new town after his friend, Colonel Thomas Bryan Martin. Stephen became sheriff of then-vast Berkeley County, with Martinsburg as the county seat.  Generals Horatio Gates and Charles Lee  both later purchased property in the county and lived nearby. In 1780, Berkeley county voters elected Stephen as one of their (part-time) representatives in the Virginia House of Delegates. In 1788, Berkeley County voters elected Stephen to the Virginia Ratifying Convention, where he spoke (and voted) in favor of ratification of the Constitution of the United States. Despite opposition by political heavyweights such as Patrick Henry and George Mason, Virginia ratified the Constitution 89 to 79, in large part because western Virginia delegates (including Stephen) supported it 15 to 1.

Legacy
Stephen died in Martinsburg in 1791, and is buried beneath a monument erected in his honor.

The Adam Stephen House in Martinsburg, and The Bower near Shepherdstown (on property he owned in what became Jefferson County, West Virginia), survive today and are listed on the National Register of Historic Places.

References

External links
 An Account of the Battle of Germantown
  A picture of the waistcoat and gorget Adam Stephen wore during the French and Indian War

Year of birth uncertain
1791 deaths
Alumni of the University of Aberdeen
Alumni of the University of Edinburgh
American city founders
Physicians from Virginia
British emigrants to the Thirteen Colonies
British America army officers
Delegates to the Virginia Ratifying Convention
18th-century Royal Navy personnel
18th-century Scottish medical doctors
18th-century American politicians
18th-century American physicians
Military personnel from Fredericksburg, Virginia
People from Jefferson County, West Virginia
Military personnel from Martinsburg, West Virginia
People of Virginia in the French and Indian War
Virginia sheriffs
Politicians from Martinsburg, West Virginia
People of pre-statehood West Virginia